The Sun Odyssey 440 is a French sailboat that was designed by Philippe Briand, Piaton Bonet Yacht Design and the Jeanneau Design Office as a cruiser and first built in 2017.

Production
The design has been built by Jeanneau in France, since 2017 and remains in production.

Design
The Sun Odyssey 440 is a recreational keelboat, built predominantly of polyester fiberglass. The hull is solid fiberglass and the deck is an injection-molded sandwich. It has a 9/10 fractional sloop rig, with a deck-stepped mast, two sets of swept spreaders and aluminum spars with discontinuous stainless steel wire rigging, with the Performance version having Dyform rigging. The hull has a plumb stem with a fixed  bowsprit, a plumb transom, with a fold-down swimming platform, dual internally mounted spade-type rudders controlled by dual wheels and a fixed fin keel or optional shoal-draft keel. Both keels are "L" shaped with a weighted bulb. The fin keel model displaces  and carries  of cast iron ballast, while the shoal draft version displaces  and carries  of cast iron ballast.

The Performance version has a taller mast and 9% greater sail area.

The design has sleeping accommodation for six people, with a double berth in the bow cabin, an "U"-shaped settee in the main cabin around a rectangular table and two aft cabins with double berth in each. The galley is located on the port side just forward of the companionway ladder. The galley is "U"-shaped and is equipped with a three-burner stove, an ice box and a double sink. A navigation station is aft of the galley, on the port side. There are two heads, one just aft of the bow cabin on the port side and one on the starboard side forward of the aft cabin.

Operational history
In 2018 the design was named the Best Monohull Cruising Boat 41 to 50ft by SAIL magazine, the Cruising World Boat of the Year: Most Innovative and the Family Cruiser European Yacht of the Year.

The boat is supported by an active class club, the Jeanneau Owners Network.

See also
List of sailing boat types

References

External links

Keelboats
2010s sailboat type designs
Sailing yachts
Sailboat type designs by Philippe Briand
Sailboat type designs by Jeanneau Design Office
Sailboat type designs by Piaton Bonet Yacht Design
Sailboat types built by Jeanneau